Terrence Hardiman (born 6 April 1937) is an English actor. He is best known for playing The Demon Headmaster in the children's television series of the same name. 

Hardiman often plays authority figures, and has portrayed Nazi-era personnel (Secret Army, Colditz, Wish Me Luck and Enemy at the Door) and British officers (When the Boat Comes In). He has also played police inspectors (Prime Suspect, Juliet Bravo and Softly, Softly), doctors (Home to Roost, The Royal), barristers (Crown Court and The Brittas Empire), judges (The Bill and The Courtroom), a twelfth-century abbot, (Cadfael), and an evil headmaster (The Demon Headmaster). He also played Prime Minister Ramsay MacDonald, in Richard Attenborough's Gandhi.

Hardiman has narrated hundreds of audiobooks, including series by Colin Dexter, Anne Perry, and Ruth Rendell. Hardiman's volunteer narration work for the non-profit Calibre Audio Library earned him a Silver Centurion service award in 2013.

Early life and education
Terrence Hardiman was born in 1937 in Forest Gate, Newham, London. His father was a policeman. Hardiman was educated at Buckhurst Hill County High School, Essex and later studied at Fitzwilliam College, Cambridge (then known as Fitzwilliam House), where he read English.

Stage career
At Cambridge, Hardiman acted extensively for The Marlowe Society and the Cambridge University Amateur Dramatic Club, in both dramatic and comedic roles, alongside many of his future screen co-stars such as Derek Jacobi. 

Hardiman then toured with the Royal Shakespeare Company in several principal roles, including as Starveling in Peter Brook's landmark 1970 production of A Midsummer Night's Dream.

Film and television career

1970s and 1980s

Hardiman's television work has included him playing barrister Stephen Harvesty in Granada Television's Crown Court from 1972 to 1983. 

He also had a starring role as Charles Pooter in the 1979 television adaptation of George and Weedon Grossmith's Diary of a Nobody, a role which shows his versatility more than the succession of officers he usually portrays. 

Hardiman portrayed Major Reinhardt, in Secret Army, the (fictional) head of the Luftwaffe (German Air force) police who often provided a foil to Clifford Rose's more brutal S.S. Chief, Kessler. In 1990, he played a German officer, General Stuckler, in the final series of London Weekend Television's Wish Me Luck.

1990s: Cadfael and The Demon Headmaster

A notable small role Hardiman played was a version of the Sergeant Wilson character from Dad's Army, in a 1995 episode of time travel comedy Goodnight Sweetheart, called "Don't Get Around Much Any More." Nicholas Lyndhurst's character Gary Sparrow goes back in time to a bank in the 1940s, and encounters characters called Mainwaring and Wilson. Hardiman's portrayal was a keenly observed impersonation of John Le Mesurier's own performance, incorporating many of the tics and mannerisms of the original.

From 1996 to 1998, Hardiman starred as the eponymous Demon Headmaster in the children's television drama series, which ran to three series and proved popular with adults as well as children. He reprised his role as a cameo in the 2019 reboot.

He also appeared as Grand Wizard Egbert Hellibore in four episodes of The Worst Witch. Hardiman appeared in the second series of The Worst Week of My Life. Another notable recent role was as a devious Swiss murder victim in an episode of crime mystery series Jonathan Creek.

Hardiman's other major recurring role was as Brother Cadfael's ecclesiastical superior, Father Abbot Radulfus, in the television series. Joining him throughout the series as Prior Robert was Michael Culver, who had played his predecessor Major Brandt in Secret Army.

2000s

Hardiman made an appearance on the daily soap on BBC One, Doctors, on 3 April 2009, as well as from 14 to 15 January 2015, and in the drama from Yorkshire, Heartbeat, as John Upton in one episode. 

In 2009, he appeared in a film for the BFI, Radio Mania: An Abandoned Work, directed by British artists Iain Forsyth and Jane Pollard. The film was based on The Man from M.A.R.S. (1922). 

Hardiman appeared as Hawthorne in the episode of Doctor Who, "The Beast Below", on 10 April 2010.

Selected filmography 
 Running Scared (1972) as Doctor
 Pope Joan (1972) as Cardinal Anastasius
 Loophole (1981) as David
 The Bunker (1981) as Hermann Fegelein 
 Gandhi (1982) as Ramsay MacDonald
 Sahara (1983) as Browne
 Mask of Murder (1985) as Dr. Paul Crossland
 God's Outlaw (1986) as Thomas Cromwell
 Prime Suspect (1993) as Commander Chiswick 
 The Demon Headmaster (1996-1998) as The Demon Headmaster
 Distant Shadow (2000) as The Svit
 Fishtales (2007) as Professor Ratcher
 Doctor Who (2010) as Hawthorne
 Mr. Turner (2014) as Gallery Visitors
 The Demon Headmaster (2019) as The Demon Headmaster
 Holby City (2021) as Henrik

References

External links

Unofficial Terrence Hardiman website

1937 births
Alumni of Fitzwilliam College, Cambridge
Living people
People from Forest Gate
English male television actors
English male film actors